Lee Brockhurst, sometimes known locally as just Brockhurst, is a village and former civil parish, now in the parish of Moreton Corbet and Lee Brockhurst in the ceremonial county of Shropshire, England. It is situated around 11 miles north-northeast of the county town of Shrewsbury.

The River Roden flows nearby to the hamlet.

In 1870, the village had a population of 133.

References

Villages in Shropshire
Former civil parishes in Shropshire